The inaugural Pan Continental Curling Championships were held from October 31 to November 6 at the Markin MacPhail Centre at Canada Olympic Park in Calgary, Alberta. The event was used to qualify teams for the 2023 World Curling Championships. The event featured both an A Division and a B Division for both the men's and women's. This new championship combined the Pacific-Asia Curling Championships and the Americas Challenge into one event.

On the men's side, Canada, the host country of the 2023 Men's World Championship, and the top four men's teams (South Korea, the United States, Japan, New Zealand) qualified for the 2023 World Men's Curling Championship in Ottawa, Ontario, Canada. Brazil, the bottom finisher in the men's A Division, were relegated to the 2023 B Division while Guyana, the top finisher in the B Division, were promoted to the 2023 A Division.

The top five women's teams in the A Division (Japan, South Korea, Canada, the United States, New Zealand) qualified for the 2023 World Women's Curling Championship in Sandviken, Sweden. Since the women's A Division had one extra member as Australia could not attend the 2021 Pacific-Asia Curling Championships, the bottom two finishers in this year's women's A Division, Hong Kong and Brazil, were relegated to the 2023 B Division. Chinese Taipei, the top finisher in the B Division, were promoted to the 2023 A Division.

On October 5, the Chinese men's and women's team withdrew from this competition which caused the Kazakhstan men's team and the Chinese Taipei women's team to be promoted to A Division. On October 10, it was announced that an error was uncovered in the ranking system and it was determined that the Australia's men team and the New Zealand women's team should be promoted to A Division instead of the Kazakhstan men's team and the Chinese Taipei women's team.

Medallists

Men

A division

Teams
The teams are listed as follows:

Round-robin standings
Final round-robin standings

Round-robin results

All draw times are listed in Mountain Time (UTC−06:00).

Draw 1
Monday, October 31, 14:00

Draw 2
Tuesday, November 1, 14:00

Draw 3
Wednesday, November 2, 8:00

Draw 4
Wednesday, November 2, 16:00

Draw 5
Thursday, November 3, 9:00

Draw 6
Thursday, November 3, 19:00

Draw 7
Friday, November 4, 14:00

Playoffs

Semifinals
Saturday, November 5, 9:00

Bronze medal game
Saturday, November 5, 18:00

Gold medal game
Sunday, November 6, 9:00

Player percentages
Round Robin only

Final standings

B division

Teams
The teams are listed as follows:

Round-robin standings
Final round-robin standings

Round-robin results

All draw times are listed in Mountain Time (UTC−06:00).

Draw 1
Monday, October 31, 19:00

Draw 2
Tuesday, November 1, 9:00

Draw 3
Tuesday, November 1, 19:00

Draw 4
Wednesday, November 2, 14:00

Draw 5
Thursday, November 3, 09:00

Draw 6
Thursday, November 3, 19:00

Draw 7
Friday, November 4, 14:00

Playoffs

Semifinals
Saturday, November 5, 9:00

Bronze medal game
Saturday, November 5, 18:00

Gold medal game
Saturday, November 5, 18:00

Final standings

Women

A division

Teams
The teams are listed as follows:

Round-robin standings
Final round-robin standings

Round-robin results

All draw times are listed in Mountain Time (UTC−06:00).

Draw 1
Monday, October 31, 9:00

Draw 2
Monday, October 31, 19:00

Draw 3
Tuesday, November 1, 9:00

Draw 4
Tuesday, November 1, 19:00

Draw 5
Wednesday, November 2, 12:00

Draw 6
Wednesday, November 2, 20:00

Draw 7
Thursday, November 3, 14:00

Draw 8
Friday, November 4, 9:00

Draw 9
Friday, November 4, 19:00

Playoffs

Semifinals
Saturday, November 5, 13:00

Bronze medal game
Sunday, November 6, 13:00

Gold medal game
Sunday, November 6, 18:00

Player percentages
Round Robin only

Final standings

B division

Teams
The teams are listed as follows:

Round-robin standings
Final round-robin standings

Round-robin results

All draw times are listed in Mountain Time (UTC−06:00).

Draw 1
Tuesday, November 1, 14:00

Draw 2
Wednesday, November 2, 9:00

Draw 3
Wednesday, November 2, 19:00

Draw 4
Thursday, November 3, 14:00

Draw 5
Friday, November 4, 9:00

Draw 6
Friday, November 4, 19:00

Playoffs

Semifinal
Saturday, November 5, 9:00

Gold medal game
Saturday, November 5, 18:00

Final standings

References

External links
 (A division)
 (B division)

Pan Continental Curling Championships
2022 in Canadian curling
Curling competitions in Calgary
2022 in Alberta
Pan Continental Curling
Pan Continental Curling